Cerace diehli is a species of moth of the family Tortricidae. It is found in Papua New Guinea and on Sumatra.

References

Moths described in 2002
Ceracini